The Ghana Railways 1851 class were a class of diesel-electric locomotives built by English Electric-AEI Traction for the Ghana Railways in 1969/70.

Description
The 1851 class were a dual cab hood type general purpose locomotive. Engine, electrical and control equipment was essentially as fitted to the British Rail Class 37 as well as a number of other export locomotives.

The main frame consisted of two fabricated box section longitudinal members with fabricated box section cross members. These box sections were sealed to form the fuel tank in the centre of the locomotive.

The bogies, designed by English Electric, were cast steel with axles fully compensated with underslung beams acting on long travel coil springs. Side bearers are totally enclosed with oil lubrication. Lateral spring controlled intercouplers link the bogies, reducing track stresses and flange wear in curves. Traction motors are mounted on the axle towards the inner end of the bogies to reduce weight transfer under load.

History
By 1999 only two remained in service. In 2003 just one, 1864, remained in storage at New Takoradi, but had been scrapped by 2007.

References

Co-Co locomotives
English Electric locomotives
Diesel-electric locomotives of Ghana
Railway locomotives introduced in 1969
3 ft 6 in gauge locomotives